Ummon is the second studio album by French progressive rock band, Slift. The album was released on 28 February 2020 through Vicious Circle. Two singles were released ahead of the album: the title track, "Ummon", in 2019, and "Hyperion" in 2020.

Track listing

Critical reception 

The album was well received by music critics. On The Elite Extremophile, the website gave Ummon a 93 out of 100 saying that Ummon "[has] harnessed the menace of doom metal, the energy of garage rock, the hypnotic repetition of krautrock, and the general strangeness of prog. They put those elements together in an impressive and intense package. This album is demanding, but it is worth your time and energy." Nathan Whittle, writing for Louder than War, gave Ummon a four out of five, saying that Ummon "the fuzz pedal clicks on though, the band launch as one in a full-on attack. On their journey, they are switching between the sounds of them slamming on the rocket boosters and then lifting off to float off into the heavens." Writing for Classic Rock magazine, Jo Kendall gave the album a 7 out of 10. Kendall compared the album to the works of Pink Floyd and Thee Oh Sees, and that the album is "generally it’s all psych rockets blasting as the Toulouse trio soar to space-prog’s summit", and called it "a high-octane 11 tracker."

In a staff review for Sputnikmusic, the album was described as a "ravaging, colourful journey that pushes and breaks through boundaries without production tricks of any kind, relying on a fantastic live performance to bring to life one of the best albums of the year." The staff gave it a 4.6 out of 5.

Accolades

References

External links 
 Ummon at Bandcamp
 

2020 albums
Slift albums